

Ernst Bolbrinker (23 October 1898 – 2 July 1962) was a general in the Wehrmacht of Nazi Germany during World War II. He was a recipient of the Knight's Cross of the Iron Cross.

Awards and decorations

 Knight's Cross of the Iron Cross on 15 May 1941 as Major and commander of I./Panzer-Regiment 5

References

Citations

Bibliography

 

1898 births
1962 deaths
Military personnel from Graz
Major generals of the German Army (Wehrmacht)
German Army personnel of World War I
Recipients of the clasp to the Iron Cross, 1st class
Recipients of the Knight's Cross of the Iron Cross
Recipients of the Silver Medal of Military Valor
German prisoners of war in World War II
20th-century Freikorps personnel